Nina Morrison (born 13 December 2000) is an Australian rules footballer playing for the Geelong Football Club in the AFL Women's (AFLW). A midfielder who won multiple accolades at junior level and played in the VFL Women's (VFLW) as a teenager, Morrison was the first selection in the 2018 AFL Women's draft. She received a nomination for the 2019 AFL Women's Rising Star award in round 1 of the 2019 season, her debut match.

Early life 
Morrison attended Geelong Grammar School and grew up a  supporter, citing Joel Selwood and Patrick Dangerfield as players she enjoyed watching. A long-distance runner in her youth who also played tennis and soccer at school, Morrison did not take up football until her father encouraged her to attend a Geelong trial in late 2016. Although she was unavailable for the under-18 trials as they conflicted with tennis commitments, she instead attended the senior trials, where she impressed Geelong representatives by outplaying the older women. Morrison joined the Geelong Falcons, playing in the TAC Cup Girls, and represented Vic Country in the 2017 AFL Women's Under 18 Championships. Additionally, she played for local club St Mary's, kicking thirty-five goals in eight games playing as a midfielder in the under-19 AFL Barwon league.

In 2018, Morrison won the TAC Cup Girls premiership with the Falcons and tied with Madison Prespakis for the league best and fairest with 16 votes. She again played for Vic Country in the 2018 AFL Women's Under 18 Championships and won their most valuable player award. Morrison was named in the All-Australian side on the wing, and shared the competition's most valuable player award with Prespakis.

Morrison tested at the AFL Women's draft combine, breaking records in the two-kilometre time trial and the yo-yo endurance test. She reached level 18.1 in the yo-yo test and ran the time trial in seven minutes and fourteen seconds, fifteen seconds faster than the previous record. Morrison additionally placed in the top five for the standing vertical jump, agility test and running vertical jump (on both the left and right sides). Draft prospects selected a state or region they wished to play in prior to the draft; options for Victorian players included Geelong, the Melbourne metropolitan area or the entire state. Morrison opted for Geelong while Prespakis, another top prospect, nominated the metropolitan area; this improved Morrison's chances of being taken with the first selection in the draft, as Geelong held the first two selections.

Morrison currently studies a Bachelor of Exercise and Sport Science at Deakin University.

AFL Women's career
Morrison was drafted by Geelong with the first selection in the 2018 AFL Women's draft. Ahead of the 2019 AFL Women's season, she polled the most votes by the AFLW captains as their predicted winner of the 2019 AFL Women's Rising Star award. Morrison made her debut in the opening round of the season against  at GMHBA Stadium, where she was nominated for the AFL Women's Rising Star award after accumulating 22 disposals and eight tackles and kicking the winning behind in a best-on-ground performance. Morrison also polled the maximum ten votes in the AFLW Champion Player of the Year Award and was named in women's.afls Team of the Week. However, she ruptured the anterior cruciate ligament in her right knee at training the following week, which required a reconstruction.

After missing the rest of the 2019 season, Morrison made a successful return to football in round 1 of the 2020 season against  at Fremantle Oval, kicking a goal.

Morrison eventually returned to football in the opening round of the 2022 season and was named among Geelong's best players in its loss to North Melbourne. She missed round 2 due to the AFL's health and safety protocols, before returning the following round against Collingwood. Morrison then missed round 4 due to calf soreness, before returning against  in round 5, where she was named among Geelong's best players.

Statistics

Statistics are correct to the end of round 7, 2022.

|- style=background:#EAEAEA
| scope=row | 2019 ||  || 9
| 1 || 0 || 1 || 13 || 9 || 22 || 2 || 8 || 0.0 || 1.0 || 13.0 || 9.0 || 22.0 || 2.0 || 8.0 || 3
|-
| scope=row | 2020 ||  || 9
| 6 || 1 || 2 || 52 || 28 || 80 || 8 || 25 || 0.2 || 0.3 || 8.7 || 4.7 || 13.3 || 1.3 || 4.2 || 3
|- style=background:#EAEAEA
| scope=row | 2021 ||  || 9
| 0 || — || — || — || — || — || — || — || — || — || — || — || — || — || — || 0
|-
| scope=row | 2022 ||  || 9
| 5 || 0 || 2 || 32 || 37 || 69 || 4 || 32 || 0.0 || 0.4 || 6.4 || 7.4 || 13.8 || 0.8 || 6.4 || 
|- class=sortbottom
! colspan=3 | Career
! 12 !! 1 !! 5 !! 97 !! 74 !! 171 !! 14 !! 65 !! 0.1 !! 0.4 !! 8.1 !! 6.2 !! 14.3 !! 1.2 !! 5.4 !! 6
|}

Honours and achievementsIndividual AFL Women's Rising Star nominee': 2019

References

External links

 
 
 

2000 births
Living people
Sportswomen from Victoria (Australia)
Australian rules footballers from Victoria (Australia)
Geelong Football Club (AFLW) players
Geelong Falcons players (NAB League Girls)